Georgia Rose Harriet Barnes (born February 1990), known mononymously as Georgia, is an English record producer, songwriter, singer, rapper and drummer. The daughter of Leftfield cofounder Neil Barnes, Georgia began her music career as a drummer for artists such as Kwes and Kae Tempest. She began her career as a singer and record producer with the release of her debut studio album Georgia (2015). Her second studio album Seeking Thrills was released in January 2020.

Georgia is signed to the label Domino. In 2018 she released the song "Started Out". In 2019 she performed at the Glastonbury Festival and won the Association of Independent Music's One to Watch award in association with BBC Music Introducing.

Vice have described her sound as "euphoric, late-night dance", while her 2015 self-titled album was compared to Missy Elliot and MIA. Talking about her 2019 single "About Work the Dancefloor" with Sean Tayler from Futuremag Music, Georgia shared "I made this song after a weekend in Berlin entirely dancing in a few clubs and I realised how important the dancefloor is to people to give them a certain relief from their everyday activities".

Her album Seeking Thrills was shortlisted for the Mercury Prize 2020.

Early life
Georgia Rose Harriet Barnes was born in London; her father is Neil Barnes, the cofounder and keyboardist of English electronic music group Leftfield. As a child, Georgia was a footballer who had played in youth squads associated with Queens Park Rangers W.F.C. and Arsenal W.F.C. She left football after the death of her coach, when she described things as getting "too intense".

Barnes attended the BRIT School in the London Borough of Croydon, where she began playing the drums professionally.

Personal life
In a 2019 interview with Billboard, Barnes discussed her decision to quit alcohol and become vegan.

Discography

Studio albums

Singles

Guest appearances

Awards and nominations

Notes

References

1990 births
Living people
English drummers
English women pop singers
English women singer-songwriters
English record producers
English women in electronic music
Musicians from London
Synth-pop singers
English women rappers
Pop rappers
21st-century English women singers
21st-century English singers